August Bournonville (1805–1879) was a Danish ballet master and choreographer, creator of Bournonville method in dance practicing.
 Antoine Bournonville (1760–1843), French ballet dancer, actor, singer and choreographer, the father of August Bournonville.

Bournonville may also refer to:
 Bournonville, Pas-de-Calais, a commune in France

Nobility 
 Alexander von Bournonville (1616–1690), Flemish military man.
 Miguel José de Bournonville, 1st Duke of Bournonville (1672–1752), Spanish noble.

See also 
 Bourneville (disambiguation)